Brenda Johnson may refer to:

 Brenda LaGrange Johnson (born 1939), an American businesswoman and diplomat
 Brenda Leigh Johnson, a fictional character in the TV series The Closer